Finally (sometimes referred as ALL TIME BEST ALBUM "Finally") is the seventh compilation album by Japanese singer Namie Amuro. It was released on November 8, 2017, by Dimension Point in three physical formats, alongside limited edition goods. Additionally, Finally is also Amuro's final musical release before she retired from the music industry on September 16, 2018.

The album compiles a total of 39 previously released singles from Amuro's back catalogue, all re-recorded with new vocals and arrangements; an additional 13 new tracks were placed on the third disc, making up for her final original album. Early commentators praised the retrospect, and Amuro, for her vocals, the production and dancing skills of the music videos. Commercially, it was a success in Japan, debuting at number one on the Oricon Albums Chart and Billboard Hot Albums chart with a record-breaking one million sales.

In order to promote the album, Amuro released six singles. The first single, "Red Carpet", was released on December 2, 2015, and followed with: "Mint", "Hero", "Dear Diary", "Fighter", and her final single "Just You and I". Furthermore, the singer embarked on a nationwide tour in various dome venues, alongside shows in China and Hong Kong before finishing in Taiwan.

Background and development
From December 2, 2015, onwards, Namie Amuro began releasing maxi-singles that would not appear on her 2015 studio album Genic, which began with the release of "Red Carpet". Alongside this, the singer prepared for two concert tours: Livegenic tour — which was to promote the album Genic — and her annual Live Style tour, which wrapped up in February 2017. Amuro had scheduled a special show in her hometown of Okinawa on September 16, 2017, to commemorate her 25th year in the music business. The concert was originally planned back in 2012 to celebrate her 20th anniversary, but was scrapped due to weather warnings. Four days later, on Amuro's 40th birthday, she announced via Facebook of her desire to retire from the music industry on September 16, 2018.

Afterwards, she revealed plans on releasing a "final album", which was speculated to be her thirteenth studio album. Instead, Amuro released details to Oricon about a compilation, originally titled All Time Best, which would include every selected single spanning between her debut (1992) to "Just You and I" (2017).

Along with the songs she had announced, the compilation album Finally featured seven brand-new tracks: "Christmas Wish" (released as a radio-only single in November 2016), "Hope", "In Two", "How Do You Feel Now?", "Showtime", "Do It For Love", and "Finally". Amuro had confirmed this on her website and announced that it would be re-titled to Finally. She published several promo photos, which coincided with its release. Finally was served as a double album, with the majority of the content consisting of her previous singles, and an additional 13 tracks that had made up a studio album. All of her singles, up until 2014's "Tsuki", were re-recorded with new vocals and arrangements in 2017 (all songs post "Red Carpet" remained in their original formats).

Release
Finally was released on November 8, 2017, by Dimension Point and Avex Trax in three physical formats and through digital stores. The three physical formats include a standard package that includes three compact discs, and the other two are DVD and Blu-ray bundles that feature the three CD's and a bonus disc containing 12 music videos, respectively; the bonus content opens with "Red Carpet", and finishes with the new music videos "Christmas Wish", "In Two", "How Do You Feel Now?", "Showtime", "Do It For Love" and "Finally". First-press editions come with a special slipcase that encloses the jewelcase, and include three individual visuals of Amuro for each edition; the slipcase has the singer's and album's name on the front, and featuring a slick grey or gold border. Additionally, all first-press copies comes with a generic poster promoting the album, and specific stores around Japan also comes with a second poster that features eight different pictures of Amuro, depending on the store. A limited edition was made available on her fan club website in early October 2017, which included a digitally-written note by Amuro.

Singles
Finally has spawned six original singles. "Red Carpet" was published as the album's first single, released on December 2, 2015, by Dimension Point and Avex Trax. Despite reaching number two on the Oricon Singles Chart, sales slumped and only shifted 36,000 units in Japan, making it one of Amuro's lowest-selling singles to date. "Mint" was the album's second single, which was released on May 18, 2016. It reached numberfour on the Oricon Singles Chart, but achieved better success through digital sales, eventually receiving the Platinum award by the Recording Industry Association of Japan (RIAJ). In June 2016, Amuro accepted an offer by the NHK to record the theme song for the Japanese entry of the 2016 Summer Olympics and following Paralympics in Rio de Janeiro. Titled "Hero", it saw a rise in physical sales for the singer, achieving a gold certification by the RIAJ. Four months later, she released "Dear Diary" and "Fighter", two A-side singles taken from the 2016 Japanese film Death Note: Light Up the New World, an adaption from the manga series of the same name; the physical released sold under 70,000 units in Japan. Amuro's final single, "Just You and I", was released in May 2017. It was moderately successful on the Oricon charts, but sold over 100,000 digital units according to RIAJ.

Promotional recordings
Various tracks from the compilation were used for commercials and advertisements in Japan. On September 5, 2017, Amuro revealed that "Showtime" would be used as the theme song for the Tokyo Broadcasting System (TBS) series Kangoku no Ohimesama, which had broadcast in early October that year. Furthermore, "Hope" was announced as the theme song for the 20th anniversary of the anime series One Piece, her second recording for the series since 2011's "Fight Together". The album's title track was confirmed as the theme song for the Japanese TV series News Zero, whereas "Do it For Love" would be incorporated as the commercial song for Hulu Japan; the latter was to promote her monthly documentary series that would eventually tie-in with her retirement in September 2018. "How Do You Feel Now?", another new recording to the album, would be used as the promotional track for Docomo's and Amuro's 25th anniversary with Tower Records. Additionally, the new re-recording of Amuro's 1996 single "Don't Wanna Cry" will be used as the theme track to the TV series Refreshing; the original mix of the single was first promoted as the image song to Japanese brand Daido Mistio.

Reception
Amongst positive reviews from Asia-based critics, Japanese website Real Sound had commended the release of Finally, believing it to encompass the "outstanding vocals and dancing skills" of Amuro between 25 years. They also noted her "dignified attitude" in the album, and thought it was the reasoning of her "enthusiastic support" over the years. Hitoshi Sugiyama released a different article on the same website, and praised the diverse styles of music on the album—which ranged from traditional J-Pop, R&B, hip-hop and electronic dance music. He also praised Amuro's "maturity" and noticed a change in tone throughout the three discs. From his selection, he picked "Dr." as the best re-recorded track, and "How Do You Feel Now?" as his favourite new recording. T-Site News also believed it to be a "representation" of masterpieces from her debut, and specified the tracks "Hero", Baby Don't Cry", "Can You Celebrate?", "Mint", "New Look", "Dr.", "Never End", "Don't Wanna Cry" and "Tsuki" as examples. Nifty News reported that many of her fans had complained about the Audio mastering of the re-recorded songs, saying that they noticed "uncomfortable" changes in Amuro's vocal performance.

According to officials from Avex Group, more than one million copies were shipped between November 7–8, including pre-ordered formats; this gave Amuro the distinction of being the only artist to have over one million shipments in four consecutive life generations (Sweet 19 Blues at age 18, 181920 at age 20, Best Fiction at age 30 and Finally at age 40). SoundScan Japan agreed, and predicted sales of over one million copies in its first week. It opened at number one on the daily Oricon Albums Chart with sales of 459,094 copies, which were the highest first day sales for an album in 2017. It remained atop the charts the following day, shifting an additional 225,295 copies.

Finally debuted atop of the Oricon Albums Chart, Billboard Hot Albums and Top Albums Sales chart with sales of 1.113 million copies in its first week, making it the highest-selling Japanese album of 2017; this is also Amuro's second fastest-selling album after her 1996 record Sweet 19 Blues—which opened with 1.921 million copies—and the first album since Utada Hikaru Single Collection Vol. 1 (2004) by Japanese singer Hikaru Utada to shift over one million in a single week. Furthermore, it is the first album in three years to sell over one million copies (the last being AKB48's Tsugi no Ashiato), and replaces herself for gaining the biggest first week sales for a female solo artist since Best Fiction, nine years later. It is also ranked as her 6th million-selling album. To date, the album has sold over 2.4 million copies, making it the best-selling album of the 2010 decade.Finally was certified 2× million by the Recording Industry Association of Japan (RIAJ) for shipments of two million units.Finally also placed first in the 2018 year-end chart, making it the first album in 43 years of Oricon history to rank number 1 in two consecutive years.

Promotion
Amuro's promotional input to Finally was extensive. Upon the album's announcement, the singer was featured on various television networks in commemoration of her past catalogue, including MTV, Space Shower and Music On!, amongst others. She also appeared on four different billboards for the cellphone network company Docomo, which also celebrates their 25 consecutive years with Amuro; she re-created four of her different posters with the company from 1995, 2003, 2010 and 2017. Between November 7 to the 17th, a pop-up store was initiated by Tower Records in the Shibuya district that showcased the album, alongside various outfits and past discography. Furthermore, Amuro will be conducting several radio and televised interviews within Japan, some which will be her very first time or her first in many years.

A farewell dome tour is scheduled to be revealed in early November, with several concert dates to be announced, and will see Amuro foray outside of Japan for the third time.

Track listing

Notes

Formats and editions
 3CD Standard edition — 52 tracks across three discs.
 First-press 3CD Standard edition — 52 tracks across three discs. Pre-ordered versions included a special slipcase package, alongside a bonus B2-sized poster. Seven posters were published in seven different stores: Seven Net, Amazon.com, Rakuten, Tower Records, Tsutaya, HMV, WonderGoo, Mu-mo and other stores.
 3CD + DVD edition — 52 tracks across three discs, including a bonus disc featuring 12 music videos.
 First-press 3CD + DVD edition — 52 tracks across three discs, including a bonus disc featuring 12 music videos. Pre-ordered versions included a special slipcase package, alongside a bonus B2-sized poster. Seven posters were published in seven different stores: Seven Net, Amazon.com, Rakuten, Tower Records, Tsutaya, HMV, WonderGoo, Mu-mo and other stores.
 3CD + Blu-ray edition — 52 tracks across three discs, including a bonus disc featuring 12 music videos.
 First-press 3CD + Blu-ray edition — 52 tracks across three discs, including a bonus disc featuring 12 music videos. Pre-ordered versions included a special slipcase package, alongside a bonus B2-sized poster. Seven posters were published in seven different stores: Seven Net, Amazon.com, Rakuten, Tower Records, Tsutaya, HMV, WonderGoo, Mu-mo and other stores.
 Limited Fan Space edition — 52 tracks across three discs, including a bonus disc featuring 12 musics (on DVD and Blu-ray formats); comes with a special slipcase. The jewelcase spine has customers named printed on it, alongside a special card digitally written by Namie Amuro.

Charts

Japanese charts

Taiwanese Chart

Certification and sales

References

External links
Finally at Namie Amuro's official website. 

2017 compilation albums
Namie Amuro compilation albums
Japanese-language compilation albums
Pop compilation albums
Contemporary R&B compilation albums
Avex Group compilation albums